Caligula is a genus of moths of the family Saturniidae. It is primarily an Oriental genus, found in India, China and Southeast Asia. The genus is often treated as a synonym of Rinaca. It is named after Roman emperor Caligula.

Species
The genus includes the following species:

 Caligula anna (Moore, 1865)
 Caligula boisduvali (Eversmann, 1847)
 Caligula cachara Moore, 1872
 Caligula grotei (Moore, 1858)
 Caligula japonica Moore, 1872
 Caligula jonasi Butler, 1877
 Caligula kitchingi (Brechlin, 2001)
 Caligula lindia Moore, 1865
 Caligula simla (Westwood, 1847)
 Caligula thibeta (Westwood, 1853)

See also
 List of organisms named after famous people (born before 1800)

References

External links
Caligula at Tony Pittaway's Saturniidae of the Western Palaearctic

 
Saturniinae